Florent Baloki (10 October 1971 – 9 November 2007) was a Congolese footballer. He played in 20 matches for the Congo national football team from 1992 to 1999. He was also named in Congo's squad for the 1992 African Cup of Nations tournament. 

He won the 1998 CAF Champions League with Ivorian club ASEC Mimosas with teammate Blaise Kouassi.

Honours

Club
Diables Noirs
 Congo Premier League: 1991
 Coupe du Congo: 1989, 1990

ASEC Mimosas
 CAF Champions League: 1998
 Ligue 1: 1995, 1997, 1998
 Coupe de Côte d'Ivoire: 1995, 1997
 Coupe Houphouët-Boigny: 1995, 1997, 1998

References

External links
 
 

1971 births
2007 deaths
Republic of the Congo footballers
Republic of the Congo international footballers
1992 African Cup of Nations players
Association football defenders
Sportspeople from Brazzaville
Republic of the Congo expatriate footballers
Republic of the Congo expatriate sportspeople in Ivory Coast
Republic of the Congo expatriate sportspeople in Belgium
Republic of the Congo expatriate sportspeople in Germany
Expatriate footballers in Ivory Coast
Expatriate footballers in Belgium
Expatriate footballers in Germany
ASEC Mimosas players
K.V. Kortrijk players
Kickers Emden players
VfB Oldenburg players
SSV Jeddeloh players
Ligue 1 (Ivory Coast) players
Oberliga (football) players